Kevin Streelman (born November 4, 1978) is an American professional golfer who plays on the PGA Tour.

Early years and amateur career
Born in Winfield, Illinois, Streelman, who caddied at famed three-time U.S. Open venue Chicago Golf Club while growing up, graduated from Wheaton Warrenville South High School in 1997 and Duke University in 2001, and is a member of the Delta Sigma Phi fraternity. He co-captained the Duke team with Paul Tucker and Denver Brown. Streelman turned professional in 2001. He played college golf at Duke with fellow PGA Tour member Leif Olson.

Professional career
Streelman's first year on the PGA Tour was 2008, after he finished 14th at the 2007 qualifying school. He has kept his place on Tour every year since then, through 2014. He tied for the lead after the first round of the U.S. Open in 2008, and entered the top 100 of the Official World Golf Ranking for the first time in March 2009.

In March 2013, during his 153rd start on Tour, Streelman achieved his first victory at the Tampa Bay Championship. He won his second in June 2014 at the Travelers Championship, one stroke ahead of runners-up K. J. Choi and Sergio García. Streelman set a PGA Tour record by closing out his final round with seven consecutive birdies.

Scorecard – June 22, 2014 – Cumulative tournament scores, relative to par

Streelman won the 2015 Masters Par-3 Contest.

Personal life
Streelman is married to Courtney Streelman. They have two kids: Sophia and Rhett. They live in Scottsdale, Arizona.

Streelman is a Christian. Kevin and Courtney have donated to Compassion International to help build a child development center in Togo.

Streelman gifted golf clubs and a golf bag to President Donald Trump in 2017.

Professional wins (3)

PGA Tour wins (2)

NGA Hooters Tour wins (1)
2007 Opelika Classic

Results in major championships
Results not in chronological order in 2020.

CUT = missed the halfway cut
"T" indicates a tie for a place.
NT = No tournament due to COVID-19 pandemic

Summary

Most consecutive cuts made – 4 (2021 PGA – 2022 PGA, current)
Longest streak of top-10s – 1

Results in The Players Championship

CUT = missed the halfway cut
"T" indicates a tie for a place
C = Canceled after the first round due to the COVID-19 pandemic

Results in World Golf Championships
Results not in chronological order before 2015.

1Cancelled due to COVID-19 pandemic

QF, R16, R32, R64 = Round in which player lost in match play
NT = No tournament
"T" = Tied

U.S. national team appearances
Professional
World Cup: 2013

See also
2007 PGA Tour Qualifying School graduates
List of Duke University people

References

External links

Who the Heck is Kevin Streelman
Kevin Streelman's Twitter page

American male golfers
Duke Blue Devils men's golfers
PGA Tour golfers
Golfers from Illinois
Golfers from Scottsdale, Arizona
People from Winfield, Illinois
Sportspeople from Wheaton, Illinois
1978 births
Living people